Nicola Molteni (born 6 March 1976) is an Italian politician from Lega Nord. He is currently Undersecretary at the Ministry of the Interior in the Draghi Cabinet.

References 

1976 births
Living people
21st-century Italian politicians
Italian Ministers of the Interior
Lega Nord politicians
Deputies of Legislature XVI of Italy
Deputies of Legislature XVII of Italy
Deputies of Legislature XVIII of Italy
Draghi Cabinet
University of Insubria alumni
Deputies of Legislature XIX of Italy